Jonathan Freeman,  is a Canadian cinematographer. A multi-award-winning director of photography for motion pictures, television and commercials, he is known for his work on Game of Thrones and Boardwalk Empire. Freeman's motion picture credits include Remember Me, Fifty Dead Men Walking, The Edge of Love, Hollywoodland and The Prize Winner of Defiance, Ohio. He frequently collaborates with directors Allen Coulter, Ernest Dickerson, David Nutter, and Russell Mulcahy.

Early life
Freeman was born in Toronto, Ontario, Canada to a mother who was a fine art painter. As an adult, he moved to New York City.

Career
Freeman was a director of photography on Game of Thrones and shot multiple episodes of Boardwalk Empire. His other television credits include historical drama Rome, the Steven Spielberg-produced miniseries Taken and pilots for the long-running TV series Ray Donovan, Sons of Anarchy and Damages.

Among the motion picture projects that Freeman photographed are the romantic drama Remember Me, starring Robert Pattinson; IRA thriller Fifty Dead Men Walking, with Ben Kingsley; Dylan Thomas drama The Edge of Love, starring Keira Knightley and Sienna Miller; crime mystery Hollywoodland, with Ben Affleck; and the 1950s-set biopic The Prize Winner of Defiance, Ohio, starring Julianne Moore.

In addition to feature films and TV, Freeman also shoots commercials.

Freeman is a member of the American Society of Cinematographers (ASC).

Awards
Freeman has earned a total of five ASC Awards and three Emmy Awards for his work on Game of Thrones, Boardwalk Empire and others. He garnered the first of eight ASC nominations for his cinematography on Prince Street and won his first ASC Award for Homeland Security.

Filmography

Film

Television

Television films

References

External links
 "Harsh Realms," Game of Thrones, Season 2
 "Shifting Gears," Game of Thrones, Season 4

Living people
Canadian cinematographers
People from Toronto
Year of birth missing (living people)